Lok Sin Tong Leung Kau Kui College (abbreviated as LSTLKKC) is a co-educational, government-subsidised secondary school located in Hong Kong, China. It is a member school under The Lok Sin Tong Benevolent Society Kowloon and sponsored by philanthropist Dr. Leung Kau Kui. 

The school, founded in September 1991, was originally called Lok Sin Tong College and was situated at Hill Road, Sai Ying Pun. In 1993, it was renamed to Lok Sin Tong Leung Kau Kui College in appreciation of the generous donation of 1.5 million Hong Kong Dollars by prominent businessman and philanthropist, Dr. Leung Kau Kui. The donation was used towards the construction of the school. The present site of the school at Hospital Road, Sai Ying Pun, was formerly occupied by multiple schools such as the Sir Ellis Kadoorie School, Helen Liang Memorial Secondary School, Yu To Sang Memorial Secondary School, and the Kennedy Town Government Secondary School (now Tseung Kwan O Government Secondary School).

Chinese is the primary medium-of-instruction with the exception of Mathematics and Sciences in early secondary years.

Development

Before 2000
LSTLKKC is situated among traditionally prestigious schools within the Central and Western District of Hong Kong. The school faced several difficulties in the early years of its establishment, such as a shortage of school facilities, due to a rapid increase in enrollment numbers. The situation improved due to rectification efforts undertaken over the years. In 1997, the school underwent a major educational reform with close to 30 changes in teaching and administration which led to a three-year cumulative increase of 148% in the passing rate of students undertaking the Hong Kong Certificate of Education Examination. This remarkable result is a testament to the effectiveness of various learning initiatives implemented that include classroom recognition, self-learning assessment, and sharing of extra-curricular reading. In a bid to remain abreast with the standards of the other prestigious EMI (English Medium-of-Instruction) schools within the locality, LSTLKKC strives to continue to improve through educational reform in areas such as subject structure, course content, teaching methods, and course preparation.

After 2000
From 2000 onward, LSTLKKC students achieved excellent scores in public examinations. A student once received a 3A results in the Hong Kong Advanced Level Examination. In addition, LSTLKKC allowed students who had good exam scores to switch from a science course to a business course in pre-university years, thereby attracting many students from traditionally prestigious schools who wanted to change classes. The interaction between transfer students and elite students from LSTLKKC created a conducive learning environment that augmented the potential of LSTLKKC to improve the school's branding.

In 2000, LSTLKKC gradually began rising in the banding system. This occurred partly due to lower standards in traditionally prestigious schools in the Western part of Hong Kong and education system reforms. This has improved LSTLKKC students' grades, enabling LSTLKKC to absorb students from other schools. In 2020, LSTLKKC is currently ranked at banding 3A-2C and is rated 269-303 out of 446 schools in Hong Kong. 

(The transfer students mainly come from Sacred Heart Canossian College, St. Louis School, and St. Stephen's Girls' College.)

Immigrant students
After the handover of Hong Kong, the government raised the quota of permanent residencies for children of Hong Konger parents who had been born in China. This resulted in many families migrating to Hong Kong to reunite the family. Some of these children were already in junior or senior high, making it difficult for them to find suitable schools when they entered Hong Kong.

It was difficult for them to enter EMI (English Medium-of-Instruction) schools as both getting accepted and getting used to the school was difficult. Furthermore, there were only two CMI (Chinese Medium-of-Instruction) schools in the Central and Western administrative district, of which LSTLKKC was one of them.

LSTLKKC took in many students who had migrated, most of whom enrolled in Secondary 1 to Secondary 4. Those who entered the fourth year of high school had had senior high education in China, and as such, obtained good grades in the national examinations. The school has introduced adaptation programmes to help these immigrant students raise their English standards.

Recent years
After many years of education reforms, there has been a considerable improvement in academic results, and student conducts at LSTLKKC. The school is well recognized by parents in the neighborhood. As student enrollment increases, the school has introduced additional programmes in the academic year 2015-2016 with English as a medium of instruction. This is an attempt to improve the prospects of their graduates.

Since 2010, a number of students from the school were awarded Hong Kong Island Outstanding Students Award: 

 2010 Hong Kong Island Top 10 Most Outstanding Students Award (Senior High) - Lee Ka Wai
 2010 Hong Kong Island Top 10 Most Outstanding Students Award (Junior High) - Keung Yeung Hong
 2011 Hong Kong Island Top 10 Most Outstanding Students Award (Senior High) - Hou Kan Wong
 2011 Hong Kong Island Top 10 Most Outstanding Students Award (Junior High) - Cheung Ka Wai
 2012 Hong Kong Island Excellent Students Award (Senior High) - Leung Hung
 2012 Hong Kong Island Excellent Students Award (Junior High) - Leung Hoi Kei
 2013 Hong Kong Island Excellent Students Award (Senior High) - Keung Heung Hong
 2013 Hong Kong Island Excellent Students Award (Junior High) - Xiu Yi Ming
 2014 Hong Kong Island Excellent Students Award (Senior High) - Cheung Ka Wai
 2014 Hong Kong Island Excellent Students Award (Junior High) - Kung Hiu Hong
 2015 Hong Kong Island Excellent Students Award (Senior High) - Che Ka Ho
 2015 Hong Kong Island Excellent Students Award (Junior High) - Chu Sen Dik
 2016 Hong Kong Island Excellent Students Award (Senior High) - Kong Hiu Hong
 2016 Hong Kong Island Excellent Students Award (Junior High) - Wu Wing Ji
 2017 Hong Kong Island Excellent Students Award (Senior High) - Cho Xiu Lui
 2017 Hong Kong Island Excellent Students Award (Junior High) - Tam Sze Yan
 2018 Hong Kong Island Excellent Students Award (Senior High) - Tong Yu Sen
 2018 Hong Kong Island Excellent Students Award (Junior High) - Chu Ka Nam

Release of results in national examinations
In recent years, LSTLKKC has circulated the 'legendary' breakthrough results of its students in national examinations. This includes one student, who despite previously failing a science course, switched to a liberal arts entrance examination and obtained a good score of 3A1B. Students who had recently migrated also achieved decent grades in the national tests. The university acceptance rate of LSTLKKC graduates is about 13%.

Subjects

Language
 English# (S1-S6)
 Chinese (S1-S6)
 Mandarin (S1-S2)

Sciences
 Mathematics# (S1-S6)
 Integrated Science# (S1-S3)
 Physics (S4-S6)
 Chemistry (S4-S6)
 Biology (S4-S6)
 Combined Science (S4-S6)
 Computer Literacy (S3)
 Technology and Living (S1-S2)
 Information & Communication Technology# (S4-S6)

Business
 Economics (S3-S6)
 Business, Accounts and Finances (S4-S6)
 Tourism and Hospitality Studies (S4-S6)

Humanities
 Liberal Studies (S3-S6)
 Geography (S1-S6)
 History (S1-S6)
 Chinese History (S1-S6)

Others
 Music (S1-S3)
 Virtual Arts (S1-S6)
 Physical Education (S1-S6)
 Civic Education (S1-S3)
 Drama (S1-S2)
 Integrated Life Education (S1-S3)
 Film Arts (S4-S6)
#represents subjects offered in English

Notable faculty
 Hung Fu Yin: Mathematics teacher, Author of Middle School Mathematics Textbook

Notable alumni

Business and Finance
 Wong Shun Hei (Owner of Transnational Transportation Company)

Engineering
 Wut Ka Wa (Hong Kong Outstanding Mechanical Engineer)
 Lee Shiu Hong (Hong Kong Outstanding Manufactoring Engineer)

References

External links
  

Sixth form colleges in Hong Kong
Lok Sin Tong